The Submarine Rescue Diving Recompression System (SRDRS) is a remotely operated underwater vehicle and its associated systems intended to replace the Mystic class deep submergence rescue vehicle as a means of rescuing United States Navy submarine crew members. The SRDRS then allows for the decompression of the crew.

References

External links
PRM Falcon on the International Submarine Escape and Rescue Liaison Office website.

Deep-submergence rescue vehicles